Burgess is a surname. Notable people with the name include:

In arts and entertainment

Actors
 Adrienne Burgess, British actress
 Dennis Burgess, British actor
 Dominic Burgess (born 1982), British actor
 Dorothy Burgess (1907–1961), American motion picture actress
 Keith Burgess, American voice actor
 Neil Burgess (actor) (born 1966), British actor
 Tituss Burgess, American actor

In music and dance
 Bobby Burgess (born 1941), American dancer and singer
 Casey Burgess (born 1988), Australian television personality, Hi-5
 Colin Burgess, Australian musician
 Emma Burgess, American singer-songwriter
 Grayston Burgess (1932–2019), English countertenor and conductor
 Iain Burgess (1953–2010), British record producer
 John D. Burgess (1934–2005), Scottish bagpiper
 Ken Burgess, British musician
 Leroy Burgess, known as Black Ivory, disco producer
 Lord Burgess (born Irving Burgie, 1924–2019), American songwriter
 Norine Burgess, Canadian singer
 Rosie Burgess (born 1978), Australian musician
 Sally Burgess (born 1953), British mezzo-soprano
 Sharna Burgess (born 1985), Australian dancer on Dancing with the Stars (US)
 Sonny Burgess (1931-2017), rockabilly musician
 Tim Burgess (artist) (born 1967), lead singer of British band the Charlatans
 Wilma Burgess (1939–2003), American country music singer

Writers
 Alan Burgess (1915–1998), English author
 Anthony Burgess (1917–1993), English novelist and critic
 Gelett Burgess (1866–1951), U.S. humorist
 Haldane Burgess (1862–1927), Shetland writer
 James Bland Burgess (1752–1824), English writer and politician
 Melvin Burgess (born 1954), British author
 Mitchell Burgess, American television writer
 Thornton Burgess (1874–1965), U.S. conservationist and children's author

In other arts
 Bruce Burgess, British documentary filmmaker
 Eliza Mary Burgess, English artist
 Gregory Burgess, Australian architect
 Henry William Burgess, English artist
 Ida Josephine Burgess, American artist
 Janice Burgess, American television producer
 Lowry Burgess, American artist
 Neil Burgess (comedian) (1846–1910), American vaudeville comedian

In government and politics

Britain/UK
 Claude Bramall Burgess (died 1998), British Colonial Secretary of Hong Kong from 1958–1963
 Guy Burgess (1911–1963), British double-agent
 James Bland Burgess (1752–1824), English writer and politician
 Joseph Burgess (1853–1934), British politician
 Stanley Burgess (born 1889), British politician

United States
 Brian L. Burgess, an associate justice of the Vermont Supreme Court
 Frank Burgess (1935–2010), American basketball player and federal judge
 Gavon D. Burgess, an associate justice of the Supreme Court of Missouri
 H. S. Burgess (1866–1952), American politician
 Isabel Burgess (1912–1999), American politician
 Lathrop Burgess, American politician
 Tim Burgess (Seattle), member of the Seattle City Council
 Walter S. Burgess, an associate justice of the Rhode Island Supreme Court

Other nations
 Cathal Brugha (Charles William St. John Burgess), Irish nationalist and politician, active in the Anglo-Irish War and the Irish Civil War (1874–1922)
 Henry Givens Burgess (1859–1937), Irish politician
 Ken Burgess (died 2005), Canadian politician
 Neale Burgess (born 1956), Australian politician

In science
 Charles Frederick Burgess (1873–1945), American chemist
 Edward Sandford Burgess (1855–1928), American botanist (abbrev. E.S.Burgess)
 Eric Burgess (1920–2005), freelance space consultant
 Ernest Burgess (1886–1966), urban sociologist at the University of Chicago
 George H. Burgess (born December 25, 1949), ichthyologist and fisheries biologist
 Warren E. Burgess, ichthyologist

In sport

Aquatic sports
 Edgar Burgess (1891–1952), English Olympic rower
 Greg Burgess (born 1972), American swimmer
 Nigel Burgess (1942–1992), British yachtsman
 Reuben Burgess (born 1966), British canoeist

Association football (soccer)
 Andy Burgess (born 1981), English footballer (soccer)
 Ben Burgess (born 1981), English-born footballer (soccer)
 Cam Burgess (1919–1978), English footballer (soccer)
 Charlie Burgess (born 1880), English footballer (soccer)
 Christian Burgess (born 1991), English footballer (soccer)
 Daryl Burgess (born 1971), English footballer (soccer)
 Herbert Burgess (1883–1954), English football player
 Joanne Burgess (born 1979), Australian footballer (soccer)
 Kevin Burgess (footballer) (born 1988), British footballer (soccer)
 Mac Burgess, English football manager
 Nigel Burgess (born 1981), Bermudan footballer (soccer)
 Oliver Burgess (born 1981), English footballer (soccer)
 Romelle Burgess (born 1982), Barbadian footballer (soccer)
 Stuart Burgess (born 1962), Scottish footballer (soccer)
 Tyrell Burgess (born 1986), Bermudan footballer (soccer)

Basketball
 Chris Burgess (born 1979), American basketball player
 Franklin D. Burgess (1935–2010), American basketball player and federal judge
 Pete Burgess (born 1984), New Zealand basketball player

Gridiron football
 Derrick Burgess, American football player, NFL defensive end for the New England Patriots
 Prescott Burgess (born 1984), American football linebacker
 Rodney Burgess (born 1984), American football player
 Ronnie Burgess (1963-2021), American football player
 Rudy Burgess (born 1984), American football player
 Terrell Burgess (born 1997), American football player

Rugby
 Clive Burgess (1950–2006), Welsh rugby union footballer
 Greg Burgess (rugby union) (born 1954), New Zealand rugby union player
 Liza Burgess (born 1964), Welsh rugby union player
 Sam Burgess (born 1988), English Rugby League player

Other sports
 Bryan Burgess, Canadian curler
 Charlotte Burgess (born 1987), British archer
 Erika Burgess (born 1984), New Zealand netball player
 Gordon Burgess, New Zealand cricket player
 Graham Burgess (cricketer) (born 1943), English cricketer
 Ian Burgess (born 1930), British Formula One driver
 Jeremy Burgess (born 1953), Australian motorcycle racing engineer
 Lauren Burgess (born 1986), New Zealand netball player
 Reg Burgess (born 1934), Australian rules footballer
 Shayne Burgess (1964), English darts player
 Smoky Burgess (1927–1991), American Major League Baseball player

In other fields
 Abbie Burgess (1839–1892), American lighthouse-keeper
 Albert Franklin Burgess (1873–1953), American entomologist
 Anthony Joseph Burgess (1938–2013), Australian-born Papua New Guinean Roman Catholic bishop
 Graham Burgess (born 1968), English chess master
 Josiah Burgess, 18th-century pirate captain
 Martin Burgess (born 1931), English clockmaker
 Samuel Burgess, 17th-century pirate captain
 Thornton Burgess (1874–1965), U.S. conservationist and children's author
 Timothy Mark Burgess (born 1956), American lawyer
 Warren Randolph Burgess (1889–1978), American banker and diplomat

Names shared by multiple people
 Colin Burgess (disambiguation)
 Daniel Burgess (disambiguation)
 David Burgess (disambiguation)
 Don Burgess (disambiguation)
 Edward Burgess (disambiguation)
 George Burgess (disambiguation)
 Harry Burgess (disambiguation)
 Jim Burgess (disambiguation)
 John Burgess (disambiguation)
 Luke Burgess (disambiguation)
 Mark Burgess (disambiguation)
 Michael Burgess (disambiguation)
 Paul Burgess (disambiguation)
 Richard Burgess (disambiguation)
 Robert Burgess (disambiguation)
 Ron Burgess (disambiguation)
 Sarah Burgess (disambiguation)
 Thomas Burgess (disambiguation)
 William Burgess (disambiguation)

Fictional characters
 Alex Burgess, fictional character from Neil Gaiman's comic book series, The Sandman
 Grace Burgess, fictional character from BBC’s Peaky Blinders TV series

See also
 Burges, a surname
 Borges

English-language surnames